The Ghosi are a Muslim community found mainly in North India.

History and origin
Muslim Ghosi/Gausi/Ghoshi of Uttar Pradesh and Bihar claim descent from the Ahir community, and indeed are known as Muslim Ahirs.

The title is derived from Ghaus-e-Azam, a Sufi saint to who most of the north Indian Sunni Muslims show their love and affection. 
The Ghosi in West Bengal claim Rathore Rajput ancestry.

The Ghosi settled in the Ambala Division of what is now the Indian state of Haryana emigrated to Pakistan.

Present circumstances

In Uttar Pradesh, they have the following sub-divisions, Thena, Chauhan, Dogar, Chikange and Bam. These sub-divisions are known as shijras, and the Ghosi prefer to marry within the shijra. Consanguineous marriages are now starting to take place. They use the surname Khan, which also used by other pastoral or agricultural Muslim communities of North India. They are found throughout North India, and in Uttar Pradesh are concentrated in the districts of Lucknow, Kanpur, Sultanpur, Meerut, Bahraich, Gonda and Kheri. They speak Urdu and various local dialects of Hindi, in particular Awadhi.

The Ghosi have a traditional caste council or panchayat,which is headed by a chaudhary. Each major Ghosi settlement has a panchayat, whose main function is to  resolve disputes within the community and maintain group identity .The community are Muslims of the Sunni sect. There are many organisation on national level has been formed and running successfully for Welfare of Community. All India Muslim Ghosi Association is one of the oldest Association. This community of people is also linked with national level political parties like All India Pichada Jan Samaj, Congress, BSP and Samajwaadi party.

Rajasthan
The Ghosi of Rajasthan claim to be of Gujjar origin. They keep large herds of cows and buffaloes and sell the milk. In Jhunjhunu and Jaipur districts, they are known as Ghosi, while in Churu, Jodhpur and Sikar districts, they are known as Gujar Ghosi. A good many Ghosi are also cultivators, and many are now landless agricultural labourers. The community are divided into a number of clans, known as gotras, the main ones being the Tinna, Khaleri, Moel, Balhud, Tatar, Bhati and Chauhan. They practice clan exogamy, while maintaining strict endogamy. All the Ghosi clans intermarry and are of equal status. The Ghosi are Sunni Muslims and speak the Shaikhawati dialect of Rajasthani.

West Bengal
The Ghosi of West Bengal are found mainly in the districts of 24 Parganas and Midnapore, in particular near the towns of Barrackpur and Kharagpur . According to the traditions of this community, they emigrated from Kanpur, in what is now Uttar Pradesh some five centuries ago. They claim to be descended from Amar Singh Rathore, a Rajput nobleman from Jhansi, on whose conversion to Islam was disowned by his caste. The community thus took up the occupation of cattle rearing, and settled in Midnapur.

The community is now divided between those who still engage in the selling of milk, and the rest of the community who are now small and medium-sized farmers. They reside in multi-caste villages, which tend to have ghosiparas, "Ghosi areas". The community now speak Bengali, although most have knowledge of Hindi. They remain strictly endogamous, and are unique among Bengali Muslims in practising clan exogamy. Their main clans are the Rathore, Dogar, Chauhan, Khelari, Tatar, Lehar and Maidul. The Ghosi of West Bengal have an informal caste council, known as a panchayat, which acts as an institution of social control, resolving disputes within the community, and providing social welfare.

See also
 Gaddi
 Gujjar
 Muslim Gaddi
 Ahir clans

References

Further reading
Verma, V. 1996. Gaddis of Dhauladhar: A Transhumant Tribe of the Himalayas. Indus Publishing Company, New Delhi.
Mohammad Imran, Impact of 'Cow Politics' on Muslim Community: A Case Study of Ghosi Community of North India

Ahir
Social groups of Pakistan
Muhajir communities
Muslim communities of Uttar Pradesh
Muslim communities of Rajasthan
Social groups of West Bengal